César Amado Lozano Figueroa (born 31 May 1977) is a Mexican former footballer who played as a goalkeeper. He Debuted with Toluca on March 4, 2007, Lozano be the first soccer player debut with 29 years old and has usually been the substitute keeper, but during the Apertura 2006 and Clausura 2007 season in the Mexican league, he was frequently the starting keeper due to Toluca using first-string keeper Hernán Cristante in the international competitions Copa Sudamericana and Copa Libertadores, and in the 2010–11 season with San Luis FC until the arrive of Óscar Pérez to San Luis for the 2011–12 season.

External links

1977 births
Living people
Liga MX players
Deportivo Toluca F.C. players
Indios de Ciudad Juárez footballers
San Luis F.C. players
Association football goalkeepers
Footballers from Guadalajara, Jalisco
Mexican footballers
Deportivo Toluca F.C. non-playing staff